Richkan (also Romanized as Rīchkān) is a village in Karvandar Rural District, in the Central District of Khash County, Sistan and Baluchestan Province, Iran. At the 2006 census, its population was 22, in 5 families.

References 

Populated places in Khash County